Romance of the Three Kingdoms VI: Awakening of the Dragon (三國志VI) is the 6th installment in Koei's famous Romance of the Three Kingdoms series.

Power up kit
Power up kit includes following features:

New tactical simulation mode. This mode consists of historical battles.
Added events.
3 new scenarios, and 5 new short scenarios.
Duel mode. This added duel tournaments.
Logs for players activities.
Editor customizes generals, cities, kingdoms, item creation.

External links
Japan Gamecity RTK6 for PSP page
Japan Gamecity RTK6 power up kit page

References 

1998 video games
Dreamcast games
PlayStation (console) games
PlayStation Portable games
6
Turn-based strategy video games
Grand strategy video games
Video games developed in Japan
Windows games